François Dubois (1790–1871) was a French neoclassical and Orientalist painter.

Life and career 
François Dubois (1790–1871) was a French neoclassical painter. He made several large oil paintings on historical subjects such as l'Érection de l'obélisque de Louqsor sur la place de la Concorde ("The erection of the Luxor obelisk on the place de la Concorde", on view at the Musée Carnavalet in Paris) and mythological subjects such as Le Sommeil d'Oreste ("The Dream of Orestes", which is at the Musée des Beaux-Arts in Quimper, France). Some of his works are also displayed at the Palace of Versailles.

Gallery

See also 
 List of Orientalist artists
 Orientalism

References 

1790 births
1871 deaths
19th-century French painters
French male painters
Orientalist painters
19th-century French male artists